Lo que el viento me enseñó is the eighth studio album by contemporary Christian music duo Tercer Cielo. The album was released digitally on April 24, 2012 was released in physical format to the shops of music, produced and distributed under the record labels Universal Music Latin/Vene Music/Fé y Obra Music/Kasa Productions/Mucho Fruto respectively.

Track listing

Personnel 
 Juan Carlos Rodríguez – mixing, producer, recording, voice
 Evelyn Herrera – voice
 Apolinar – trombone
 Richard Bravo – battery
 José Fléte – trombone
 Rebecca Jefferson – changing room
 Axel Rivera – battery

References 

2012 albums
Tercer Cielo albums